Henmaru Machino (町野 変丸 Machino Henmaru, sometimes given as 'Hanmaru', born 1969, Aomori Prefecture) is a Japanese artist, described as the Magritte of the eromanga world, whose works prominently feature themes of bestiality, dysmorphia, hermaphrodism, and body transformation, as well as dozens of other sexual paraphilia. Most of his work has emerged within a paradigm of hentai manga and images, but some has appeared in galleries; several of his pieces were part of Takashi Murakami's traveling Superflat exhibition.

Machino started his career through submitting illustration work to the hentai magazine Manga Hot Milk.

While Machino's work defies any easy categorization, it could be said to fall within the Japanese EroGuro (Erotic Grotesque) school, still somewhat loosely defined, which dates back to Dada-influenced, Showa-era Decadence. Some assert that it is pornography of the most extreme variety, and nothing more. While porn-or-art debates have been occurring around a wide variety of works for centuries across the globe, the debates surrounding Machino are unique in that his subject matter is at the far fringes of human sexual experience, and even beyond it, in that much of what he draws could never occur in the real world. While many EroGuro artists create works that could have real-world analogues (S&M, mutilation, etc.), Machino's images of, for example, girls with dozens of phalli sprouting from each of the dozens of breasts that cover their body, are not something any viewer of his work could ever see in life, and thus the issue of "what is pornography?" strongly preempts the issue of "art or pornography?" in some of his work.

Partial list of works

  - Mediax/MD Comics, 1994.
 SM Chokyoshi Hitomi - Unlicensed game for Super Famicom.
  - Issui Sha/Izumi Comics, 1994.
  - East Press, 1996.
 Hōtō ni Atta Eroi Hanashi - Sanwa Shuppan, 1996.
  - Ohta Shuppan/Ohta Comics, 1996.
  - Issui Sha/Izumi Comics, 1997
  - Issui Sha/Izumi Comics, 1998.
  - Ohta Shuppan/Ohta Comics, 1998.
  - Kubo Shoten/World Comics, 1998.
  - Sanwa Shuppan, 1998.
 Nuruemon - Issui Sha/Izumi Comics, 1998.
 Kenzen Hentai Shōjo - Kubo Shoten/World Comics Special, 2002.
  - Sanwa Shuppan, 1997
  - East Press, 1999
  - Issui Sha/Izumi Comics, 199?

References

External links 
 Machino works list (Japanese)

Living people
Machino Henmaru
Machino Henmaru
Ero guro
Hentai creators